Everybody Knows is an album by Stephen Stills and Judy Collins, credited to "Stills & Collins".   It marks the first collaboration between the former lovers and longtime friends. It was financed through a crowdfunding campaign on PledgeMusic.

Background

From 1968 to 1969, Stills and Collins were romantically involved.  Stills wrote several songs about Judy, most notably "Suite: Judy Blue Eyes" and "Judy".  But despite Stills playing on several of Collins' recordings, they never recorded as a duo or performed on stage together.  Stills said that he and Collins "talked over the years and muddled through conversations about if we did make a record together", ultimately releasing Everybody Knows and going on tour.

Release
Everybody Knows was released on September 22, 2017, and entered and peaked on the "Billboard 200" chart at number 195.

Track listing

Personnel
Stills & Collins
 Stephen Stills — vocals, guitars
 Judy Collins — vocals, guitar

Additional musicians
 Tony Beard — drums
 Marvin Etzioni — mandolin, mandocello (on "Everybody Knows")
 Kevin McCormick — bass
 Russell Walden — piano, organ

Production
 Producers — Alan Silverman, Collins, Etzioni, Stills
 Executive producer — Katherine DePaul
 Engineer — Alex Williams
 Mixing — Silverman, Michael Colub, Mike Tierney, Paul Rolnick
 Mastering — Eleni Maltas

Charts

References

Stephen Stills albums
Judy Collins albums
2017 albums
Collaborative albums